Daniel Gremsl (born 2 August 1992) is an Austrian professional footballer who plays for SV Lafnitz.

Club career
He made his Austrian Football First League debut for TSV Hartberg on 2 August 2011 in a game against LASK Linz.

References

External links
 

1992 births
People from Hartberg District
Living people
Austrian footballers
Austrian expatriate footballers
Austrian expatriate sportspeople in Germany
Expatriate footballers in Germany
TSV Hartberg players
FC Admira Wacker Mödling players
FSV Zwickau players
SKU Amstetten players
2. Liga (Austria) players
Austrian Football Bundesliga players
3. Liga players
Association football midfielders
Footballers from Styria
21st-century Austrian people